Hurghada Aquarium is an aquarium located in Hurghada, Red Sea Governorate, Egypt in Magawish area. It is home to over 1200 individual animals, and 100 species. It is easily one of the continent's largest aquariums, as well as Egypt's largest and nearly the largest in the Arab world. It contains 24 separate exhibits, included among them a shark tunnel, rainforest and "Whale Valley", based on fossils found in the Western Desert. The facility is also home to a Bedouin life exhibit, and an animal zoo. The Aquarium's notable specimens include: nurse shark, stingrays, green sea turtle, shovelnose guitarfish and eagle rays.

References

Aquaria in Egypt